The Wachau Marathon (stylized as WACHAUmarathon) is a 26.2-mile foot race on paved roads along the Danube River from Emmersdorf to Krems an der Donau in Wachau, Austria, usually held in September. The race was founded in 1998, and its course is certified by World Athletics.  It has hosted the Austrian National Championships thrice before.

The event also includes a half marathon, a race of length , and races for children.  There were more than 7,000 participants in total for 2019.

History 

The marathon was first held in 1998.

After Helmut Paul led the event for ten years, another company under the leadership of Michael Buchleitner took over the responsibility for the run in 2008.

The Austrian National Championships have been held three times as part of the Wachau Marathon. In 2002, the Austrian marathon champions were Max Wenisch (2:27:48, 7th overall male) and Veronika Kienbichl (2:53:09, 8th overall female).  In 2007, the Austrian half marathon champions were Eva-Maria Gradwohl (1st overall female) and Martin Pröll (1:05:31).  In 2010, the Austrian half marathon champions were Andrea Mayr (1:14:21, 3rd overall) and Günther Weidlinger (1:04:59, 7th overall).

The 2020 edition of the race was cancelled due to the coronavirus pandemic, with registrants receiving a refund via a voucher.

Course 

The course is described as fast and flat with beautiful scenery. The half marathon starts in Spitz, and the "quarter marathon" in Dürnstein.

Other races 
During the race weekend, there is also a half marathon favored by competitive runners that often has a deep international field. On the preceding day, children's runs are held over different distances.

From 2004 to 2007, an ultramarathon of length  was offered, which was part of the European Ultramarathon Cup.

Winners

Course records
Marathon
 Men: 2:12:32, John Kipngeno Rotich (KEN), 2003
 Women: 2:33:32,  (POL), 2002

Half Marathon
 Men: 59:53, Peter Cheruiyot Kirui (KEN), 2016
 Women: 1:09:21, Perendis Lekapana (KEN), 2018

Marathon

Half marathon

"Quarter marathon"

Ultra marathon 
 Held from 2004 to 2007

Notes

References

External links
Official website

Marathons in Europe
Marathons in Austria
Tourist attractions in Austria
Athletics competitions in Austria
Recurring sporting events established in 1998
Inline speed skating competitions